Richardson is an unincorporated community in Lawrence County, in the U.S. state of Kentucky.

History
A post office has been in operation at Richardson since 1883. The community was named in honor of George S. Richardson, a railroad official.

References

Unincorporated communities in Lawrence County, Kentucky
Unincorporated communities in Kentucky